The 2018 Melbourne 400 (known for sponsorship reasons as the 2018 Coates Hire Supercars Melbourne 400) was a motor racing event for the Supercars Championship that was held on the weekend of 22 to 25 March 2018. The event was run at the Melbourne Grand Prix Circuit in Melbourne, Victoria, and marked the first running of the Melbourne 400. It was the second event of sixteen in the 2018 Supercars Championship and consisted of two races of 130 kilometres, and two races of 70 kilometers. The races were run in support of the 2018 Australian Grand Prix and marked the first time that the Supercars support races would be a points-paying round of the Supercars Championship.

Results

Practice

Race 3

Qualifying 

Notes
– Todd Hazelwood, although his best time exceeded the specified qualifying time cut-off, the Stewards gave him permission to race.

Race

Championship standings after Race 3

Drivers Championship

Teams Championship

 Note: Only the top five positions are included for both sets of standings.

Race 4

Qualifying 

Notes
– James Golding received a 5-place grid penalty for impeding Craig Lowndes during qualifying.

Race 

Notes

– Jack Le Brocq received a 15-second Time Penalty for Careless Driving, causing contact with James Courtney.

Championship standings after Race 4

Drivers Championship

Teams Championship

 Note: Only the top five positions are included for both sets of standings.

Race 5

Qualifying 

Notes

– Todd Hazelwood received a 5-place grid penalty for impeding Lee Holdsworth during qualifying.

Race 

Notes

– Anton de Pasquale received a 5-second post-race Time Penalty for Careless Driving, failing to leave room and causing Rick Kelly lost 4 positions.

Championship standings after Race 5

Drivers Championship

Teams Championship

 Note: Only the top five positions are included for both sets of standings.

Race 6

Qualifying 

Notes

– James Courtney and Shane van Gisbergen, although their best time exceeded the specified qualifying time cut-off, the Stewards gave them permission to race.

Race 

Notes

– Cameron Waters received a 5-second Time Penalty for Careless Driving, causing contact with Anton de Pasquale.
– Lee Holdsworth received a Pit-Lane Penalty equivalent Time Penalty (40 seconds) for a breach of the Safety Car Restart procedures.

Championship standings after Race 6

Drivers Championship

Teams Championship

 Note: Only the top five positions are included for both sets of standings.

References

External links

Melbourne 400
Melbourne 400
Melbourne 400